Jorge F. Fumero Fernández (born August 29, 1968) is a Cuban baseball player and Olympic gold medalist.

Fumero is a one time Gold medalist for baseball, winning at the 1996 Summer Olympics.

External links
Olympic Info
 

1968 births
Living people
Olympic baseball players of Cuba
Baseball players at the 1996 Summer Olympics
Olympic gold medalists for Cuba
Olympic medalists in baseball

Medalists at the 1996 Summer Olympics